Brojendragee Luhongba is a 1973 black and white Indian Meitei language film produced and directed by S.N. Chand (Sapam Nodia Chand), the first filmmaker of Manipur. It stars S.N. Chand and Y. Ramola Devi in lead roles. It is based on Lamabam Kamal's short story of the same title. S.N. Chand underwent cosmetic surgery for the film. Principal photography began in 1971 and the film got CBFC certification on 30 December 1972. The movie was released at Usha Cinema, Paona Bazar on 26 January 1973. The digitalised version (4K) of the film was screened at MSFDS (Manipur State Film Development Society), Imphal on 29 April 2022 as a part of the Golden Jubilee Celebration of Manipuri Cinema.

In the story, Dr. Kamal reflects the mode of marriage prevalent in the Manipuri society during his days. During marriage decisions, parents of both sides hold supreme authorities to the engaged bride and the engaged groom. Neither of the wedding partners could utter anything about the marriage.

Synopsis 
Brojendra, a doctor, agrees to marry a girl of his mother's choice being an obedient son. But he refuses to look at her face, even after marriage.

At a musical performance in his locality, days after his marriage, he chances upon a beautiful girl and exchanges meaningful glances with her. He returns home guilt-ridden for having neglected the girl whom he married and committing the wrongful act of giving undue attention to another girl, who was a complete stranger.

A surprise awaits him at his house. The beautiful girl who has swept him off his feet turns out to be none other than his wife.

Cast
 S.N. Chand as Brojendra
 Y. Ramola Devi as Malti
 Oinam Biramangol as Brojendra's maternal uncle
 Uma Hijam
 Indu
 Nabakanta

Accolades

See also 
 List of Meitei-language films

Footnotes

References

External links 
 
 

1973 films
Meitei-language films